Sir Francis Knox-Gore, 1st Baronet (1803 – 25 May 1873) was an Anglo-Irish baronet.

Knox-Gore was the son of James Knox-Gore and Lady Maria Louisa Gore, daughter of Arthur Gore, 2nd Earl of Arran. He was educated at Eton College and Trinity College Dublin. Knox-Gore was appointed Lord Lieutenant of Sligo on 5 December 1831. In 1840 he served as High Sheriff of Mayo. On 5 December 1868 he was created a baronet, of Belleek Manor in the Baronetage of the United Kingdom. He gained the rank of Colonel in the Sligo Rifle Regiment of Militia.

He married Sarah Knox was succeeded in his title by his eldest son, Charles.

References

1803 births
1873 deaths
19th-century Anglo-Irish people
Alumni of Trinity College Dublin
Baronets in the Baronetage of the United Kingdom
High Sheriffs of Mayo
Lord-Lieutenants of Sligo
People educated at Eton College